Jacob Moelart or Moelaert (1649–1732) was a Dutch Golden Age painter and art collector.

Biography
He was born and died in Dordrecht. According to Houbraken he was a pupil of Nicolaes Maes and learned how to paint a good portrait, but was better at history paintings.

According to the RKD he is known for his art collection as well as his paintings.

References

1649 births
1732 deaths
Dutch Golden Age painters
Dutch male painters
Artists from Dordrecht